Regalado station is an under-construction Manila Metro Rail Transit (MRT) station situated on Line 7 located along Commonwealth Avenue, Fairview, Quezon City, Philippines. The station is nearby the Fairview Center Mall, National College of Business and Arts and the Far Eastern University - Nicanor Reyes Medical Foundation.

External links
Proposed Regalado Avenue MRT Station

Manila Metro Rail Transit System stations
Proposed railway stations in the Philippines